Arshak Makichyan (born  ) is a climate and anti-war activist based in Russia, originally from Armenia. Until he was arrested in December 2019 he staged a solo school strike for the climate every Friday in Pushkin Square, Moscow, for more than 40 weeks. In Russia, individual protests are lawful but anything larger requires police permission. Makichyan has applied to hold a bigger demonstration unsuccessfully more than 10 times.

He has inspired others across Russia to take part in school strike for the climate, including other single person pickets in Moscow. In December 2019 he was jailed for six days, hours after returning from Madrid, Spain, where he spoke at the 2019 United Nations Climate Change Conference (COP 25).

After Russia's 2022 invasion of Ukraine he expanded his protests, writing "I'm against the war" on dozens of his climate stickers, since he wasn't able to find a shop that would print the word "war." Makichyan was a social media manager, until his job "ceased to exist" after the Russian invasion of Ukraine led to websites being blocked in Russia. After having to leave the country, he was put on trial while in exile in Germany, losing his Russian citizenship as a result. The Court accuses him of providing false information about himself when applying for his Russian citizenship in 2004, despite being just 10 years old at the time.

He studied violin at the Moscow Tchaikovsky Conservatory.

See also
 Greta Thunberg
 Individual and political action on climate change
 List of school climate strikes
 Fridays For Future
 2022 Russian invasion of Ukraine

References

External links
 
 "Arshak Makichyan: The lone picketer" – interview with Makichyan at UNESCO

Climate activists
21st-century Russian people
21st-century Armenian people
Place of birth missing (living people)
Year of birth missing (living people)
Living people
Russian people of Armenian descent
1990s births
Stateless people